The Viti Levu Group is an archipelago in Fiji consisting Viti Levu island and its outliers.

Geography

The outlying islands include:
 Bau
 Beqa
 Nukulau
 Vatulele

Several island groups close to Viti Levu, such as the Lomaiviti archipelago and Yasawa islands, could be considered outliers, but are usually classified as separate island chains in their own right.

See also

.
Archipelagoes of Fiji
Archipelagoes of the Pacific Ocean